Páidí O'Brien (born 13 February 1984 in Cork, Ireland) is an Irish professional cyclist. He won the National Under-23 Road Race Championships twice, and in the senior National Road Race Championships, O'Brien has twice came second and third three times.

O'Brien was a member of the team time trial squad that won the opening stage of Vuelta a Extremadura in April 2008. As first of the team across the line, he wore the leader's jersey for the second stage. He lost nine seconds and the jersey went to team-mate Benny Deschrooder.

Major results

2002
 1st  National Junior Road Race Championships
2003
 2nd National Under-23 Road Race Championships
2004
 3rd National Under-23 Road Race Championships
2005
 1st  National Under-23 Road Race Championships
2006
 1st  National Under-23 Road Race Championships
 3rd National Road Race Championships
 7th Druivenkoers Overijse
2007
 2nd National Road Race Championships
 2nd Overall Rás Tailteann
2008
 1st Stage 1 (TTT) Vuelta a Extremadura
 2nd National Road Race Championships
 10th Overall Rás Tailteann
 10th Ronde van Overijssel
2009
 3rd National Road Race Championships
2012
 1st  National Intervarsity Road Race Championships
 2nd National Intervarsity Time Trial Championships
 3rd National Criterium Championships
2013
 1st  National Criterium Championships
2014
 3rd National Road Race Championships
2015
 2nd National Criterium Championships

References

External links
 
 
 

1984 births
Living people
Irish male cyclists
Sportspeople from Cork (city)